Desiderata is a 1971 album by Les Crane with music by Broadway composer Fred Werner and concept and various lyrics by David C. Wilson. It is a spoken word album with sung refrains and instrumental accompaniment. The title, and title track, come from the widely circulated poem "Desiderata", which at the time was in circulation as ancient wisdom and not known to be a 1927 poem by Indiana lawyer Max Ehrmann.

Crane's supporting musicians included singer Evangeline Carmichael, whose daughter, Carol Carmichael, sang the "child of the universe" refrain on the title track, with musicians keyboardist Michel Rubini, guitarist Louie Shelton, flautist Jim Horn, and two percussionists, Joe Porcaro and Emil Richards. The album won the Grammy Award for Best Spoken Word Album.

Music
The album included both well-known poetry, Henry David Thoreau's "Different Drummer," (retitled "Independence" on the track list) and "Wilderness" (retitled "Nature") as well as original compositions such as "Friends."

The title track poem "Desiderata" had already been recorded by ex-Nice drummer Brian Davison's project band Every Which Way on the album Brian Davison's Every Which Way in 1970 as "Go Placidly", to a tune by keyboardist and singer Graham Bell. "Go Placidly" was released as a single. The musical setting on Les Crane's album was by Broadway composer Fred Werner; it was Werner's music publisher Robert Bell of Crescendo Publishing who identified the original source of the poem on the poster as being Max Ehrmann. Werner's setting for Les Crane featured repeated singing of the refrain "You are a child of the universe, No less than the trees and the stars: You have a right to be here."

Lindsay Planer, in her review of the album for AllMusic, says, "Crane's dulcet-toned reading became an anthem for those wishing to perpetuate the message of peace and love that had seemingly been abandoned in the wake of the '60s," and calls the album itself "an inspired timepiece with an ageless message, rather than the one-hit wonder novelty that history will undoubtedly remember it as."

Chart history (title track)

Weekly charts

Year-end charts

Track listing
"Prologue" – 0:18 
"Desiderata" (Max Ehrmann, Fred Werner) – 4:18 
"Vision" (Traditional, Werner) – 3:19 
"Friends" (Wilson, Crane, Werner) – 4:42 
"Beauty (Shining from the Inside Out)" (Wilson, Werner) – 3:03 
"Happiness (I Got No Cares)" (Wilson, Werner) – 2:19 
"Esperanza (Hope)" (Werner) – 2:33 
"Nature (Wilderness)" (Rachel Thoreau, Werner) – 2:52 
"Courage (Eyes That See)" (Wilson, Werner) – 4:26 
"Independence (A Different Drummer)" (Thoreau, Ehrmann, Werner) – 2:29 
"Love (Children Learn What They Live)" (Werner) – 3:43 
"Epilogue" – 0:33

References

1971 albums
Grammy Award for Best Spoken Word Album
Spoken word albums by American artists
1970s spoken word albums